The 2017 FC Irtysh Pavlodar season is the 26th successive season that the club will play in the Kazakhstan Premier League, the highest tier of association football in Kazakhstan. Irtysh will also participate in the Kazakhstan Cup and the Europa League.

Season events
On 9 August, Dimitar Dimitrov resigned as manager of the club, with Sergei Klimov being appointed in a caretaker capacity the next day. Vyacheslav Hroznyi was appointed as the club's new manager on 17 August.

Squad
.

Transfers

Winter

In:

Out:

Summer

In:

Out:

Released

Competitions

Kazakhstan Premier League

Results summary

Results by round

Results

League table

Kazakhstan Cup

UEFA Europa League

Qualifying rounds

Squad statistics

Appearances and goals

|-
|colspan="14"|Players away from Irtysh Pavlodar on loan:
|-
|colspan="14"|Players who left Irtysh Pavlodar during the season:

|}

Goal scorers

Disciplinary record

References

External links
Official Website

FC Irtysh Pavlodar seasons
Irtysh Pavlodar